Bonaventura Secusio, O.F.M. Obs. (died March 1618) was a Catholic prelate who served as Bishop of Catania (1609–1618), Bishop of Messina (1605–1609), Bishop of Patti (1601–1605), the Latin Patriarch of Constantinople (1599–1618), and as Minister General of the Order of Observant Friars Minor (1593–1600).

Biography
Bonaventura Secusio was ordained a priest in the Order of Friars Minor Observants. In 1593, he was appointed the Minister General of the Order of Observant Friars Minor. On 10 March 1599, he was appointed by Pope Clement VIII as Latin Patriarch of Constantinople and consecrated bishop on 14 March 1599 by Alessandro Ottaviano de' Medici, Archbishop of Florence with Fabio Blondus de Montealto, Latin Patriarch of Jerusalem, and Domenico Bolano, Bishop of Canea, serving as co-consecrators. In 1600, he resigned as Minister General of the Order of Observant Friars Minor. On 30 April 1601, he was appointed by Pope Clement VIII as Bishop of Patti. On 17 August 1605, he was appointed by Pope Paul V as Bishop of Messina. On 10 June 1609, he was appointed by Pope Paul V as Bishop of Catania where he served until his death in March 1618.

References

Further reading
 (for Chronology of Bishops) 
 (for Chronology of Bishops) 
 (for Chronology of Bishops) 
 (for Chronology of Bishops) 
 (for Chronology of Bishops) 
 (for Chronology of Bishops) 
 (for Chronology of Bishops) 
 (for Chronology of Bishops)

External links 
 

1618 deaths
17th-century Roman Catholic bishops in Sicily
Bishops appointed by Pope Clement VIII
Bishops appointed by Pope Paul V
Observant Franciscan bishops
Latin Patriarchs of Constantinople